Kurt Mehlhorn (born 29 August 1949) is a German theoretical computer scientist. He has been a vice president of the Max Planck Society and is director of the Max Planck Institute for Computer Science.

Education and career

Mehlhorn graduated in 1971 from the Technical University of Munich, where he studied computer science and mathematics, and earned his Ph.D. in 1974 from Cornell University under the supervision of Robert Constable. Since 1975 he has been on the faculty of Saarland University in Saarbrücken, Germany, where he was chair of the computer science department from 1976 to 1978 and again from 1987 to 1989. Since 1990 has been the director of the Max Planck Institute for Computer Science, also in Saarbrücken. He has been on the editorial boards of ten journals, a trustee of the International Computer Science Institute in Berkeley, California, and a member of the board of governors of Jacobs University Bremen. He also served on the Engineering and Computer Science jury for the Infosys Prize from 2009 to 2011.

Awards and honors
He won the Gottfried Wilhelm Leibniz Prize in 1986, the Gay-Lussac-Humboldt-Prize in 1989, the Karl Heinz Beckurts Award in 1994, the Konrad Zuse Medal in 1995, the EATCS Award in 2010, and the Paris Kanellakis Award in 2010. He was named a member of the Academia Europaea in 1995, Fellow of the Association for Computing Machinery in 1999, a member of the Berlin-Brandenburg Academy of Sciences in 2001, a member of the German Academy of Sciences Leopoldina in 2004, a foreign member of the National Academy of Engineering in 2014, and a foreign member of the National Academy of Sciences in 2014. He has received honorary doctorates from the Otto von Guericke University of Magdeburg in 2002 and the University of Waterloo in 2006. He is the 2014 winner of the Erasmus Medal of the Academia Europaea.

Research

Mehlhorn is the author of several books and over 250 scientific publications, which include fundamental contributions to data structures, computational geometry, computer algebra, parallel computing, VLSI design, computational complexity, combinatorial optimization, and graph algorithms.

Mehlhorn has been an important figure in the development of algorithm engineering and is one of the developers of LEDA, the Library of Efficient Data types and Algorithms.

Mehlhorn has played an important role in the establishment of several research centres for computer science in Germany. He was the driving force behind the establishment of a Max Planck Institute for Computer Science in Germany, the Max Planck Institute for Computer Science (MPII). Mehlhorn is managing director of the institute and heads the department of algorithms and complexity. He also initiated the research center for computer science at Dagstuhl and the European Symposium on Algorithms.

Books
. Revised and translated as Data Structures and Algorithms, Springer-Verlag, 1984.
.
.
.
.
.

Selected publications
.
.
.
.
. Also available as Princeton TR-310-91.

References

1949 births
Living people
German computer scientists
Researchers in geometric algorithms
Gottfried Wilhelm Leibniz Prize winners
Academic staff of Saarland University
Max Planck Institute for Informatics
Technical University of Munich alumni
Cornell University alumni
Members of Academia Europaea
Fellows of the Association for Computing Machinery
Members of the United States National Academy of Engineering
Foreign associates of the National Academy of Sciences
Max Planck Society people